Imaandaar is a  1987 Indian Bollywood action crime drama film directed by Sushil Malik and produced by Surendra Pal Choudhary and Mrs. Sarla Sandhu. The film stars Sanjay Dutt, Farah in lead roles, along with Rohan Kapoor, Ranjeet, Mehmood, Pran, Om Prakash in supporting roles.

Plot 
Raju (Sanjay Dutt) is an orphan. He has been brought up in an orphanage - Bal Mandir. Amina (Shammi) who owns a guest house, is very fond of children, but has no children of her own - so she adopts Raju and Vijay (Rohan Kapoor) Raju loves Vijay as his own brother. Vijay loves his studies and wants to fulfill his dead father's dream of becoming a chemical engineer - but lacks the necessary funds. Here, Raju makes the noble gesture of providing him money to see him through college and finally sending him to London, for his training. In London, Vijay meets Rai Sahab (Pran). Before Rai Sahab can get to know him and his background - he is forced to leave London as his only daughter Renu (Farah) is ill. Renu is a stubborn, adamant girl, as she is pampered a lot by her father. And the impulsive girl forces her father to get her engaged to the dashing young lad Kailash (Sumeet Saigal). Now, this Kailash is the son of Ramesh Sinha (Ranjeet), who is now posing himself as Singhania.

Cast
Sanjay Dutt as Rajesh "Raju"
Farah as Renu Rai
Rohan Kapoor as Vijay Verma "Viju"
Ranjeet as Ramesh Sinha / Singhania
Mehmood as Tiwarilal
Pran as Sudarshan Rai
Om Prakash as Nath
Shammi as Ameena
Satyen Kappu as Dr. Saxena
Sudhir Dalvi as Dr. Raj Bahadur Verma
Mukri as Chef Nathulal
Chandrashekhar as Shekhar
Vikas Anand as Jimmy
Dinesh Hingoo as Havaldar
Sumeet Saigal as Kailash Sinha
Subbiraj as Sudhir

Songs

External links

1987 films
1980s Hindi-language films